Nadira Begum is a Bangladeshi folk singer. She was awarded Shilpakala Padak by the Government of Bangladesh in 2015.

Early life and career
Begum was born to A.K.M. Abdul Aziz, a classical and folk singer. She was enlisted as a radio artiste in 1960s.

Begum served as the president of the Bhawaiya Academy.

References

Living people
Bangladeshi folk singers
21st-century Bangladeshi women singers
21st-century Bangladeshi singers
Place of birth missing (living people)
Date of birth missing (living people)
Year of birth missing (living people)